Lily of Killarney is a 1929 British silent drama film directed by George Ridgwell and starring Cecil Landau, Barbara Gott and Dennis Wyndham. The film is based on the play by Dion Boucicault, The Colleen Bawn, and is set in the Irish town of Killarney in the nineteenth century.

Plot
A poor aristocrat hires a dwarf to drown his secret wife so he may marry an heiress.

Cast
 Cecil Landau as Hardress Cregan
 Barbara Gott as Sheelah
 Edward O'Neill as Corrigan
 Gillian Dean as Ann Chute
 Pamela Parr as Eily O'Connor
 Wilfred Shine as Father Tom
 Henry Wilson as Danny Mann
 Dennis Wyndham as Myles-na-Coppaleen

References

Bibliography
 Low, Rachel. The History of British Film: Volume IV, 1918–1929. Routledge, 1997.

External links

1929 films
1920s historical drama films
British historical drama films
Films shot at British International Pictures Studios
British silent feature films
British films based on plays
Films set in Ireland
Films set in the 19th century
Films directed by George Ridgwell
British black-and-white films
1920s British films
Silent drama films